The 1890 Nebraska Old Gold Knights football team represented the University of Nebraska–Lincoln in the 1890 college football season. It was the Cornhuskers' first season. The team was unofficially coached by Langdon Frothingham, though his actual role is unclear. Nebraska played no home games.

Frothingham suffered a broken leg while participating in a practice scrimmage prior to NU's game against Doane. After spending just one year teaching at Nebraska, he was hired at the Veterinary College of Dresden, and later at Yale's Sheffield Scientific School, before returning to Boston to teach at Harvard from 1901 until his retirement in 1928.

Having won both games against the only other viable Nebraska-based teams, the Old Gold Knights claimed what amounted to a state championship.

Before the season
Nebraska fielded its first football team in 1890. Dr. Langdon Frothingham, a veterinary physician and graduate of Harvard who was hired in 1889 to teach physiology, agriculture, and bacteriology, coached the team, mainly because he had brought a football with him from the East Coast. It is unclear if Frothingham traveled with the team to either of their two games, but it is known that he broke his leg preparing with the team for their second game, which actually took place in February 1891. If Frothingham did attend the game, he would have been on crutches, but it is possible he had already left the university to teach in Dresden by then.

Schedule

Coaching staff

Roster

Game summaries

Omaha YMCA

The University of Nebraska fielded their first football team, at the time without an official name, against the Omaha YMCA, on November 27, 1890. Approximately 500 students from the Lincoln campus were in attendance, a significant contingent given the transportation options available for a 55-mile journey. Early American football games were divided into two halves instead of four quarters, with four-point touchdowns and two-point "field kicks" after touchdowns.

Omaha started the game with possession and drove 40 yards before fumbling to Nebraska. Nebraska failed to capitalize, coming as close as one yard from the end zone before a penalty meant the drive resulted in no points. Omaha's subsequent possession ended early when an attempt to kick the ball out of the end zone failed and the kicker was tackled for a safety by Charles Chandler and James Porterfield, marking Nebraska's first-ever points scored and putting them ahead 2–0.  After several possession changes, Nebraska came close enough to try for a field goal. However, the play was executed as a drop-kick, and although it went through the uprights it was ruled as a punt by officials, and no points were awarded.

Nebraska soon after forced an Omaha fumble in their end zone, but Omaha recovered it to prevent the touchdown, instead suffering another safety which brought the scoreboard to 4–0 Nebraska. After a third safety early in the second half, Nebraska led 6–0. The teams traded several more scoreless possession until Nebraska's Albert Troyer broke through the line and scored a touchdown to put Nebraska up 10–0, and time expired soon afterward.

The YMCA's team colors were white and red, a pairing that would eventually be adopted by Nebraska. A local newspaper mentioned a rematch game in Lincoln a few weeks later, but it was not played.

Doane

The Nebraska football team, now christened the "Old Gold" and eventually remembered as the "Old Gold Knights", played the second and final game of the program's first season against Doane College in Crete, Nebraska.

Nebraska's started the game with a 50-yard pass to Ebenezer Mockett, and a subsequent 25-yard touchdown run by Oliver.  The field kick was good and Nebraska was ahead 6–0. Later in the half, Oliver scored another touchdown, but the field kick failed and Nebraska led 10–0. Just before halftime, Ebenezer Mockett rushed for another touchdown to put Nebraska up 14–0.

Both teams struggled in the second half, resulting in numerous kicks and fumbles as the teams traded possession. Eventually, Doane's kicker dropped the ball in the endzone, and it was recovered by James Porterfield for another Nebraska touchdown. Again, the field kick failed, and the score remained 18–0 until time expired.

References

Nebraska
Nebraska Cornhuskers football seasons
College football undefeated seasons
Nebraska Old Gold Knights football